The Bernhard's mantella (Mantella bernhardi) is a species of frog in the family Mantellidae.
It is endemic to Madagascar.
Its natural habitats are subtropical or tropical moist lowland forests, rivers, swamps, and heavily degraded former forest.
It is threatened by habitat loss. Collection for the pet trade is strictly limited, as it could pose a threat to the species.

References

Mantella
Endemic frogs of Madagascar
Species endangered by grazing
Species endangered by subsistence agriculture
Species endangered by logging for timber
Species endangered by logging for charcoal
Species endangered by deliberate fires
Species endangered by urbanization
Species endangered by habitat fragmentation
Species endangered by the pet trade
Amphibians described in 1994
Taxonomy articles created by Polbot